Club Atlético Almería was a Spanish football club based in Almería, Andalusia. Founded in 1947, it held home matches at Estadio Ciudad Jardín, with a 10,000 (5,000-seat) capacity.

History
Club Atlético Almería was founded in 1947 by the merger between Almería CF and Náutico Almería CD. Atlético Almería was named as UD Almería between 1947 and 1953.

Season to season

As Club Atlético Almería

2 seasons in Segunda División
11 seasons in Tercera División

External links
BDFutbol team profile

Defunct football clubs in Andalusia
Sport in Almería
UD Almería
Association football clubs established in 1947
Association football clubs disestablished in 1960
1947 establishments in Spain
1960 disestablishments in Spain
Segunda División clubs